Elisabeth Wilms was a German filmmaker born on July 22, 1905 in Lengerich, Westphalia. She filmed and edited several documentaries in Germany during and after World War II. She died on August 25, 1981 in Dortmund.

Early life 
Wilms grew up in Lengerich, Westphalia as the daughter of a butcher who ran a small sausage factory. She later moved to Dortmund in 1931 where she married Erich Wilms and helped him run his bakery. In 1941, she happened to see a neighbor screening an amateur 8 mm film and was fascinated by the technology. “It was completely new to me that you could make films yourself,” Wilms would later say about this occasion, “Before that, I seldom took photos, and when I did, I took insignificant pictures. I felt as if I was now close to fulfilling my most secret desires.” She then joined a film club in Dortmund where she quickly learned how to make her own 8 mm films.

Career 
In total, Wilms made over 150 short films from her discovery of filmmaking in 1943 until her death in 1981.

After Dortmund was devastated by a bombing run from Allied forces in 1944, Wilms filmed the aftermath, showing the destroyed streets and the distraught families in one of her most well-known documentaries, Alltag nach dem Krieg. These recordings were compiled by the Evangelical Relief Corporation and sent abroad to collect donations and care packages for Dortmund.

Her filmography also covered topics of reconstruction; such as Dortmunds neue Westfalenhalle, a documentary which covered the construction of the new Westfalenhallen in 1952 after it was previously destroyed during World War II.

Later in her career, Wilms would also be commissioned to make television advertisements, such as Flirt mit einer Maschine, a 10-minute advertisement for the new Constructa washing machine.

Filmography 

 Pumpernickel - 1942
 Der Weihnachtsbäcker - 1943
 Alltag nach dem Krieg - 1948
 Dortmunds neue Westfalenhalle - 1952
 Durch das Sonnenland Italien - 1955
 Flirt mit einer Maschine - 1955

Legacy 
For her work providing footage of the war in Alltag nach dem Krieg, Wilms received the Federal Cross of Merit in 1964

In 1980, Wilms and Erich participated in a documentary film by Jürgen Klauß and Michael Lentz titled Brot und Filme - Das große Hobby der Elisabeth Wilms, where she provides retrospective commentary for some of her earlier films.

Her collection of films was transferred to the Westphalian State Museum of Art and Cultural History film archive in 2007.

Bibliography

References

External links 

German film directors
1905 births
1981 deaths
German women film directors